Sid the Science Kid (also known as Jim Henson's Sid the Science Kid) is an American computer-animated children’s television series on PBS Kids. It aired from September 1, 2008 to March 25, 2013, with a total of 66 half-hour episodes produced over two seasons, and lasted for four years. The computer generated show is produced by The Jim Henson Company and PBS affiliates KCET channel 28 in Los Angeles, California for season 1, and KOCE-TV channel 50 in Huntington Beach, a suburb of Los Angeles, for season 2, using the Henson Digital Puppetry Studio. The show is produced by motion capture which allows puppeteers to voice digitally animated characters in real time.

Production began in January 2008 with 42 half-hour episodes of Sid the Science Kid having been ordered. The series debuted on PBS Kids on September 1, 2008 with a two-year on-air commitment. The original working title for the series was "What's the Big Idea?" and the central character, Sid, was originally named Josh. The series is the second CGI animated show to use the motion capture technique after Donkey Kong Country.

Premise
The main character in the show is Sid, an "inquisitive youngster" who uses comedy to tackle questions kids have about basic scientific principles and why things work the way they do. He tries to answer questions and solve problems with the help of his classmates (May, Gerald, and Gabriela), Teacher Susie, and his family (his mother Alice, his father Mort, his Grandma Rose and his baby brother Zeke). In "Hello Doggie," Sid's Grandma adopts a dog from the animal shelter (which she names Philbert – voiced by Bruce Lanoil, motion captured by Daisy the dog).

The conceptual content of Sid is based in national science learning standards, cognitive learning theory, and on the preschool science curriculum, Preschool Pathways to Science.

In Season 1, each week's episodes are built around a single scientific topic or concept. The first week (episodes 1 – 5) focuses on scientific tools and concepts (such as charts, observation, estimation, and measuring). The second week (episodes 6 – 10) focuses on changes and transformation (including decay, growth, freezing and melting, and the effects of heat). The third week (episodes 11 – 15) focuses on the senses (including touch, smell, sight, taste, and hearing). The fourth week (episodes 16 – 20) focuses on health (including brushing teeth, eating good-tasting food, sneezing and exercise). The fifth week (episodes 21 – 25) focuses on simple machines (including wheels, inclined planes, levers and pulleys). The sixth week (episodes 26 – 30) focuses on backyard science (including animal communication, animal homes, dirt and leaves). The seventh week (episodes 31 – 35) focuses on weather (including rain, sunblock, temperature and wind). The eighth week (episodes 36 – 40) focuses on the human body (including digestion, muscles, lungs and bones). The Friday shows are designed to review, reinforce and summarize the central concept of the week.

Characters

Main
 Sid (motion captured by Misty Rosas and voiced by Drew Massey) always wished about being a scientist when he grows up. Sid is the most practical character on the show and is often portrayed as a very supportive friend and leading scientist in his group. He ponders many questions every day while at his school, sometimes after thinking of them the night before. His special item is a toy microphone with four different colored buttons. When pressed, the blue button plays the recorded laughter of people, the yellow button plays the recorded applause, the red button makes a cow noise, and the white button records echoes. Sid's mother is of African descent and mainly does research as noted in every episode and his father grew up Jewish as noted in the Hanukkah/Christmas/Kwanzaa episode.
 Gabriela (motion captured by John Munro Cameron and voiced by Alice Dinnean) is Sid's classmate. Unlike her friends, Gabriela is the most sensible character and often comes up with the best jokes during Good Laughternoon. She is the most authoritative figure of the quartet, often being second-in-command of the group activities. She likes playing Pretend, always opting to be a "mommy" parent. She has an older brother named Mateo.
 Gerald (motion captured by Alon Williams and voiced by Victor Yerrid) is Sid's best friend. Although often a straggler at the start of Rug Time, he is enthusiastic, rambunctious, imaginative, and known for his creative entrances into the school, during which he often pretends to be something other than himself (like an elephant, or a race car driver).  He has a dog called Chester.  He is perhaps the most vivid character of the group, often being the life and soul of activities. A running gag is that he is always trying to be funny, but almost never succeeds.
 May (motion captured by Dana Michael Woods and voiced by Julianne Buescher) is one of Sid's best friends; she is known for her friendliness and politeness and is considerably smarter than her other three friends. She is Asian, has a cat named Mooshu, and wears glasses due to nearsightedness, which is proven in the episode "Grandma's Glasses" when she has trouble seeing the eye chart. She is the friendliest of the four, characterized by her charm and courtesy.

Recurring
 Susie (called "Teacher Susie" by Sid before the "Rug Time" segment, Sid's Teacher) (motion captured by Sonya Leslie and voiced by Donna Kimball) is the teacher at Sid's school. She begins the day with "Rug Time," where she calls her students over to sit in a circle and ask them if they have anything to share with the class. Usually the theme that gets everyone's attention is what was discussed during "Sid's Survey" and what Sid was thinking about earlier in the day. She demonstrates the experiments with her class each school day, following Sid's main question theme during Super Fab Lab; she also sings a song about the episode's topic before she takes Sid and his friends back to their homes.
 Mort (motion captured by John Munro Cameron and voiced by Victor Yerrid) is Sid's father. He works in construction and often relates Sid's observations to his work experiences.
 Alice (motion captured by Sonya Leslie and voiced by Alice Dinnean) is Sid's mother. She is a website designer and children's computer game developer (seen in Episode 58 "The Amazing Computer Science Tool!"). She also frequently searches the web to help Sid find information about his questions before dropping him off for school.
 Zeke (motion captured by Alon Williams and voiced by Donna Kimball) is Sid's baby brother. He is almost one year old, doesn't know anything yet, and is mostly shown sitting at the kitchen table in a high chair.
 Rose (motion captured by Dana Michael Woods, voiced by Julianne Buescher and Donna Kimball) is Sid's paternal grandmother and Mort's mother. She likes to tell Sid stories about herself when she was younger while driving Sid home from school.
 Dr. Rosalinda Cordova (motion captured by Michelan Sisti and voiced by America Ferrera) is Gabriela's mother and marine biologist. Her job is working at the Science Center that Sid and his friends often visit during some episodes of Season 2. She helps to explain the various exhibits at the center and how they relate to the school lessons Sid and his friends are having.

Episodes

Sid the Science Kid: The Movie (2013)

A TV movie titled Sid the Science Kid: The Movie premiered on PBS Kids on March 25, 2013. It featured the original voice cast of the show, with special guest voice Christopher Lloyd as Dr. Bonanodon. In the movie, Sid and his friends enter a contest and win a trip to a new science museum in town. Sid and Gabriela won the contest and are allowed inside the museum before it officially opens to the public. Along the way, they meet some new friends; such as Yang Yang, Niu Niu, and BobbyBot. However, BobbyBot malfunctions, causing the museum to be in total chaos and havoc, putting the grand opening of the museum in jeopardy. It's up to Sid and his friends to save the museum before it opens up. This also serves as the series finale of Sid the Science Kid.

Awards
"Save the Stump!" won in the Children's Programming category Saturday at the 26th Genesis Awards, presented by the Humane Society of the United States. Additionally, the series has received a total of six Daytime Emmy Award nominations and a TCA Award nomination.

See also
Bill Nye the Science Guy

References

External links
 PBS Kids' Sid the Science Kid website
PBS Kids' Sid the Science Kid Read and Play App
PBS Kids' Sid the Science Kid Science Fair App
 
 
 

2000s American animated television series
2010s American animated television series
2000s preschool education television series
2010s preschool education television series
2008 American television series debuts
2013 American television series endings
American children's animated comedy television series
American children's animated musical television series
American computer-animated television series
American preschool education television series
American television shows featuring puppetry
American television series with live action and animation
Animated preschool education television series
Animated television series about children
Elementary school television series
English-language television shows
PBS Kids shows
PBS original programming
Science education television series
Television series by The Jim Henson Company